Joaquín Ayuso García (born 1955 in Madrid, Spain). Chief Executive Officer of Grupo Ferrovial, one of the world's leading infrastructure groups in terms of earnings and market capitalisation with more than 100,000 employees.

Career
He joined Ferrovial in 1982, starting as site engineer; he was subsequently promoted to Project Supervisor, Group Manager, Area Manager and Regional Manager. From 1999 to 2002, he was CEO of "Ferrovial Agromán", the Group's construction arm.

He was appointed member of the Board of Directors of Bankia on 25 May 2012 (reelected on 15 March 2013).

Education
Ayuso graduated in Civil Engineering from the Universidad Politécnica de Madrid.

References

External links

Grupo Ferrovial Website

Spanish businesspeople
Polytechnic University of Madrid alumni
Living people
1955 births
Directors of Bankia